Wescott may refer to:

Places
 Wescott, Minnesota
 Wescott, Nebraska
 Wescott, Wisconsin
 John Wescott Three-Decker, historic triple decker in Worcester, Massachusetts
 Wescott Infant School, infant school in Wokingham, Berkshire, England

People with the surname
 Blake Wescott, American musician	
 Glenway Wescott, American novelist
 John W. Wescott, New Jersey Attorney General
 Leo Wescott, Australian rules footballer
 Lloyd Wescott, American agriculturalist
 Samuel Wescott, mayor of Jersey City
 Seth Wescott, American snowboarder

See also
 Westcott (disambiguation)